The Weaker Sex is a 1948 British drama film directed by Roy Ward Baker and starring Ursula Jeans, Cecil Parker and Joan Hopkins.

It was one of the most popular films at the British box office in 1948. The film's subject was what The New York Times described as the "heroics of that valiant legion of women who stood, but did not wait, through the long war years and the now dreary post war years."

Plot
Set near Portsmouth, one of the main bases for the D-Day invasion fleet, the film portrays life on the British home front during World War II.

During the run up to D-Day (1944), widowed Martha Dacre (Ursula Jeans) tries to keep house and home together for her two daughters and two servicemen billeted on her. Although her two daughters serve as Wrens, and her son is away in the Navy, she has chosen to stay at home as a housewife (although she also participates in fire-watching and works in a canteen). When she learns that her son's ship was damaged during the landings, she experiences regrets about not taking a more active role in the war.

Using occasional footage of actual events and with frequent reference to contemporary newspaper and wireless reports, the story moves forward from D-Day to VE-Day, the 1945 general election and on to 1948 when the film was made. Martha eventually re-marries to naval officer Geoffrey (Cecil Parker) who was one of the men billeted on her and has by now become a father-figure to her son and daughters.

Cast
 Ursula Jeans as Martha Dacre 
 Cecil Parker as Geoffrey Radcliffe 
 Joan Hopkins as Helen 
 Derek Bond as Nigel 
 Lana Morris as Lolly 
 John Stone as Roddy 
 Digby Wolfe as Benjie 
 Thora Hird as Mrs. Gaye 
 Bill Owen as Soldier 
 Marian Spencer as Harriet Lessing 
 Kynaston Reeves as Captain Dishart
 Eleanor Summerfield as Clippie
 Dorothy Bramhall as Mrs. Maling
 Gladys Henson as Woman in Fish Queue 
 Merle Tottenham as Woman in Fish Queue
 Vi Kaley as Old Woman On Sea Front
 Marjorie Gresley as Shop Supervisor

Production 

The film was shot at Denham Studios with location shooting taking place in Margate, Portchester Castle and the village of Denham in Buckinghamshire. The film's sets were designed by the art director Alex Vetchinsky. It was adapted by Esther McCracken from her own 1944 play No Medals, with additional material added to continue the story until the present day in 1948.

Box Office
The film was popular at the British box office. According to Kinematograph Weekly the 'biggest winner' at the box office in 1948 Britain was The Best Years of Our Lives with Spring in Park Lane being the best British film and runners-up being It Always Rains on Sunday, My Brother Jonathan, Road to Rio, Miranda, An Ideal Husband, Naked City, The Red Shoes, Green Dolphin Street, Forever Amber, Life with Father, The Weaker Sex, Oliver Twist, The Fallen Idol and The Winslow Boy.

Critical reception
Critical reception was lukewarm, but the film had some defenders. A critic for The News of the World wrote, "I see that according to my fellow critics The Weaker Sex ... is riddled with faults. Therefore I ask your indulgence for being incapable of detailing these grave weaknesses. I must have missed them because I was enjoying myself so much".

The New York Times wrote, "a thoroughly professional cast and an adult script make the drama genuine and trenchant. Ursula Jeans is excellent as the beleaguered mother who minimizes her work and sacrifices by remarking "one is given no choice — just a little extra strength from somewhere." Cecil Parker is equally adept in his restrained portrayal of the commander she eventually marries. The wonderful Thora Hird contributes a superbly droll bit as a Yorkshire servant and Joan Hopkins, Lana Morris, Digby Wolfe, Derek Bond and John Stone add solid characterizations as the children and sons-in-law" ; and Sky Movies wrote, "the best reviews of the period were saved for Thora Hird as Mrs Gage [sic], the 'daily' with a dry sense of humour", and concluded, "good, solid drama told convincingly – if a trifle over-sentimental today."

References

Bibliography
 Murphy, Robert. Realism and Tinsel: Cinema and Society in Britain 1939-48. Routledge, 2003.

External links

1948 films
1948 drama films
Films directed by Roy Ward Baker
British drama films
British films based on plays
Films set in 1944
Films set in 1945
Films set in 1948
Films set in London
Films set in Hampshire
Films set on the home front during World War II
Two Cities Films films
British black-and-white films
Films produced by Paul Soskin
Films with screenplays by Paul Soskin
Films shot at Denham Film Studios
Films shot in Hampshire
Films shot in Kent
1940s English-language films
1940s British films